Draško Mrvaljević (born 17 November 1979) is a Montenegrin former handball player.

Career
Over the course of his career that spanned more than two decades, Mrvaljević played for Lovćen (1997–2000), Sintelon (2000–2002), Teucro (2003–2005), Torrevieja (2005–2007), Koper (2007–2009), Frisch Auf Göppingen (2009–2012), Bregenz (2012–2013), GWD Minden (2013–2014), Hapoel Rishon LeZion (2014–2015), SG Pforzheim/Eutingen (2015–2016) and Maccabi Rehovot (2016–2018). He won two consecutive EHF Cup titles with Frisch Auf Göppingen.

At international level, Mrvaljević represented Montenegro at the 2008 European Men's Handball Championship and 2013 World Men's Handball Championship. He missed the 2014 European Men's Handball Championship due to an injury.

Honours
Frisch Auf Göppingen
 EHF Cup: 2010–11, 2011–12

References

External links

 EHF record

1979 births
Living people
Sportspeople from Cetinje
Montenegrin male handball players
RK Sintelon players
CB Torrevieja players
Frisch Auf Göppingen players
Liga ASOBAL players
Handball-Bundesliga players
Expatriate handball players
Serbia and Montenegro expatriate sportspeople in Spain
Montenegrin expatriate sportspeople in Spain
Montenegrin expatriate sportspeople in Slovenia
Montenegrin expatriate sportspeople in Germany
Montenegrin expatriate sportspeople in Austria
Montenegrin expatriate sportspeople in Israel